Taha Abdi Ali (born 1 July 1998) is a Swedish professional footballer who plays for Malmö FF. He has previously played for Sundbybergs IK, IFK Stocksund, Sollentuna FK, Örebro SK, Helsingborgs IF, Västerås SK.

Futsal
Ali played six international matches and scored one goal between 2018 and 2019 for the Swedish national futsal team. At club level, he played for Nacka Juniors FF and Hammarby Futsal in the Swedish Futsal League.

Career 
Ali grew up in Tensta and started playing football at the age of eight in Spånga IS. At the end of 2013, he joined Sundbybergs IK at the age of 15. Ali scored three goals in 11 games for the club in Division 2 in 2017. He then played two years in IFK Stocksund. For the 2020 season, Ali was signed by Sollentuna FK. He scored 10 goals and as many assists in 29 games in the 2020 Ettan Norra, where Sollentuna finished in third place.

In February 2021, Ali was signed by Örebro SK, where he signed a three-year contract. Ali made his Allsvenskan debut on 24 May 2021 in a 2–1 loss to Malmö FF, where he was substituted in the 84th minute. After scant playing time (three competitive games in total), Ali was loaned out to Superettan club Västerås SK in August 2021 on a loan deal for the remainder of the season. The loan was a success for Ali, who scored two goals and eight assists in 15 games, helping Västerås stay in Superettan. He was also awarded the VLT prize as Västerås' best athlete in 2021, becoming the first footballer from Västerås SK to win the award.

In February 2022, Ali was signed by Helsingborgs IF, where he signed a four-year contract.

References 

1998 births
Living people
Swedish footballers
Sundbybergs IK players
Sollentuna FK players
Örebro SK players
Västerås SK Fotboll players
Helsingborgs IF players
Ettan Fotboll players
Allsvenskan players
Superettan players
Swedish men's futsal players